The Economic Bloc "Croat Democratic Union for Prosperity" was a political alliance in Bosnia and Herzegovina.

History
The alliance was formed for the 2002 general elections by the People's Party for Work and Betterment and the Croatian Democratic Union of Bosnia and Herzegovina. It received 1.3% of the vote in the national parliamentary elections, winning a single seat in the national House of Representatives, taken by Mladen Potočnik. Its candidate for the Croat member of the Presidency, Mladen Ivanković-Lijanović, finished second with 17% of the Croat vote. The alliance also won two seats in the House of Representatives of the Federation of Bosnia and Herzegovina.

References

Defunct political parties in Bosnia and Herzegovina
Political party alliances in Bosnia and Herzegovina
Croat political parties in Bosnia and Herzegovina